Narine Aleksanyan  (born on May 24, 1967), is an Armenian actress and presenter. She is known for her recurring role as Janna on Domino (Armenian TV series). In 1992-1995 she has started working as an actress in "Metro" theater. She has one award as Best Actress of year (Artavazd annual award). She has hosted more than ten television programs.

Filmography

References

External links 
 

Armenian television presenters
1967 births
Living people
People from Gyumri
Armenian film actresses
21st-century Armenian actresses
20th-century Armenian actresses
Armenian stage actresses
Honored artists of Armenia
Armenian women television presenters